General Kumaramangalam Colony (also known as G.K.M. Colony) is a sub-neighbourhood of Perambur, Chennai. It was initially created as a residential area for ex-Military persons. It is named after Paramasiva Prabhakar Kumaramangalam, a former Indian Army Chief of Staff.

This area is also known as "Butt Medu", as there used to be small hill made of mud for the army people to practice shooting and once the military camps were removed in early 70's, the mud hill was made flat and the new residential area was developed.

Location

The area goes from the right side of Perambur Loco Works railway station end to the Villivakkam railway station. This place forms a part of the newly created Constituency "Kolathur".

The area was basically developed as residential, but now a few small commercial establishments have emerged.

Nearby places

 Villivakkam
 Kolathur (Chennai)
 Periyar Nagar
 Peravallur
 Jawahar Nagar
 Agaram, Chennai
 Thiru. Vi. Ka. Nagar
 Sembium
 Perambur
 Ayanavaram

Worshipping places

There are Temples, Churches, Mosques and many catholic grottos.

Water resource

A small pond in between street 9 and street 10 & a large pond between street 24 and street 25 serve the people for their needs.

Transport

Road transport

Though the infrastructure is reasonable, the Public Road Transport is not well developed. The community is depending on buses from either Villivakkam, I C F or Periyar Nagar Bus Terminus.  Further connecting to this area from South West is hindered by a Level Crossing (which is the first level crossing in the route from Chennai Central towards Bangalore).

Nearby Bus terminuses include Thiru.Vi.Ka. Nagar bus terminus and Perambur bus terminus.

Rail transport

There is a railway station nearby called Perambur Loco Works railway station.
Other nearer railway stations are Villivakkam railway station, Perambur Carriage Works railway station and Perambur railway station.

Education

There are two Chennai Schools and a few government run Kindergartens (Balvadis).

Medical amenities

There is also a public hospital nearby.

Specialities

There is a temple for former Chief Minister of TamilNadu, Dr. M.G.R.; this is the first temple for an actor in Tamil Nadu.

There is a family of Anglo-Tamil decent living in 8th street.

Veterans' facilities
Neighbourhoods in Chennai